Anand Abhyankar  (2 June 1963 – 24 December 2012) was an Indian Marathi film, television and theatre actor. He starred in films such as Spandan (2012), Balgandharva (2011), Matichya Chuli (2006), Vaastav (1999) and Jis Desh Mein Ganga Rehta Hain. On television, he is known for his roles in Mala Sasu Havi, Taarak Mehta Ka Ooltah Chashmah, Fu Bai Fu, Avaghachi Sansar and Asambhav. Abhyankar died on 24 December 2012 in a car crash.

Career
Abhyankar developed his interest in acting while graduating from Pune, where he worked in a few plays performed in his college. Later, he joined various theatre groups. His first big break came with the commercial play Kuryat Sada Tingalam. Written by Shivraj Gorle, this comedy play was produced by Rasikraj Productions and directed by Mangesh Kadam. The play also starred actors Mohan Joshi and Suhasini Deshpande. The play was successful and performed more than 1000 shows. Later, Abhyankar also performed in the Marathi play Aai Retire Hotey, alongside actress Bhakti Barve; this show was performed more than 950 times. He also played the notable roles of Paropkari Gampu and Gaja Khot for the theatrical adaptations of the book Vyakti Aani Valli, written by Pu La Deshpande.

Abhyankar also played various cameo and side roles in many Marathi as well as Hindi films. His commercial hit Bollywood films include Vaastav (1999) and Jis Desh Mein Ganga Rehta Hain (2000), both directed by Mahesh Manjrekar. He was seen in a few commercial advertisements as well. His film career in Marathi spanned from comedy, serious to character roles. In the 2006 film Matichya Chuli, he replaced the deceased actor Sudhir Joshi. The film thus has the same character played by two different actors. He also directed one Marathi film, Majhi Vithai Mauli.

Abhyankar starred in various Marathi television shows. His earliest roles include the show Gharkul that aired on DD Sahyadri. His recent role of Dinanath Shashtri from the serial Asambhav (2009) was of an 85-year-old man, almost double his age. His portrayal of a man suffering with Parkinson's disease, with a shivering body language was highly appreciated and won him awards. He also participated in the comedy competitive show Fu Bai Fu, paired with actress Supriya Pathare. Before his death in December 2012, Abhyankar was seen playing a character role in the Zee Marathi's show Mala Sasu Havi, alongside actress Asawari Joshi, which was later played by Rajan Bhise. His last Marathi film Gadbad Gondhal, directed by Yogesh Gosavi is releasing in 2018.

Personal life
Abhyankar was born and brought up in Nagpur, Maharashtra. He was born in a middle-class family to Moreshwar and Ashadevi on 2 June 1963. His father was a labour welfare officer and his mother worked in the Post and Telegraph department. Abhyankar did his education till 12th standard from Nagpur and then moved to Pune, Maharashtra. He graduated in Commerce from the Garware College. He also worked in Bajaj Auto for over two years before turning to acting professionally.

Death
Abhyankar died in a car crash on Mumbai-Pune Expressway on 23 December 2012, when his Suzuki Wagon R was hit by a tempo (an Indian 3-wheel vehicle) coming from the opposite direction. He was returning to Mumbai after finishing the shoot of his upcoming film Duniyadari. Akshay Pendse, his co-star from the TV show Mala Sasu Havi, also died in the same crash. He is survived by his wife Anjali, daughter and son.

Filmography

Films

Television

Theater

References

External links 
 

1963 births
2012 deaths
Male actors in Hindi cinema
Indian male television actors
Indian male soap opera actors
Road incident deaths in India
20th-century Indian male actors
21st-century Indian male actors
Male actors in Marathi theatre
Male actors in Marathi television